A concerto (plural concertos, or concerti from the Italian plural) is, from the late Baroque era, mostly understood as an instrumental composition, written for one or more soloists accompanied by an orchestra or other ensemble. The typical three-movement structure, a slow movement (e.g., lento or adagio) preceded and followed by fast movements (e.g. presto or allegro), became a standard from the early 18th century.

The concerto originated as a genre of vocal music in the late 16th century: the instrumental variant appeared around a century later, when Italians such as Giuseppe Torelli started to publish their concertos. A few decades later, Venetian composers, such as Antonio Vivaldi, had written hundreds of violin concertos, while also producing solo concertos for other instruments such as a cello or a woodwind instrument, and concerti grossi for a group of soloists. The first keyboard concertos, such as George Frideric Handel's organ concertos and Johann Sebastian Bach's harpsichord concertos were written around the same time.

In the second half of the 18th century, the piano became the most used keyboard instrument, and composers of the Classical Era such as Joseph Haydn, Wolfgang Amadeus Mozart and Ludwig van Beethoven each wrote several piano concertos, and, to a lesser extent, violin concertos, and concertos for other instruments. In the Romantic Era, many composers, including Niccolò Paganini, Felix Mendelssohn, Frédéric Chopin, Robert Schumann, Johannes Brahms, Pyotr Ilyich Tchaikovsky and Sergei Rachmaninoff, continued to write solo concertos, and, more exceptionally, concertos for more than one instrument; 19th century concertos for instruments other than the piano, violin and cello remained comparatively rare however. In the first half of the 20th century, concertos were written by, among others, Maurice Ravel, Edward Elgar, Richard Strauss, Sergei Prokofiev, George Gershwin, Heitor Villa-Lobos, Joaquín Rodrigo and Béla Bartók, the latter also composing a concerto for orchestra, that is without soloist. During the 20th century concertos appeared by major composers for orchestral instruments which had been neglected in the 19th century such as the clarinet, viola and French horn.

In the second half of the 20th century and onwards into the 21st a great many composers have continued to write concertos, including Alfred Schnittke, György Ligeti, Dimitri Shostakovich, Philip Glass and James MacMillan among many others. An interesting feature of this period is the proliferation of concerti for less usual instruments, including orchestral ones such as the double bass (by composers like Eduard Tubin or Peter Maxwell Davies) and cor anglais (like those by MacMillan and Aaron Jay Kernis), but also folk instruments (such as Tubin's concerto for Balalaika or the concertos for Harmonica by Villa-Lobos and Malcolm Arnold), and even Deep Purple's Concerto for Group and Orchestra, a concerto for a rock band. 

Concertos from previous ages have remained a conspicuous part of the repertoire for concert performances and recordings. Less common has been the previously common practice of the composition of concertos by a performer to performed personally, though the practice has continued via certain composer-performers such as Daniil Trifonov.

Genre
The Italian word concerto, meaning accord or gathering, derives from the Latin verb concertare, which indicates a competition or battle.

Baroque Era

Concerto as a genre of vocal music

In the 17th century, sacred works for voices and orchestra were typically called concertos, as reflected by J. S. Bach's usage of the title "concerto" for many of the works that we know as cantatas. The term "concerto" was initially used to denote works that involved voices and instruments in which the instruments had independent parts—as opposed to the Renaissance common practice in which instruments that accompanied voices only doubled the voice parts. Examples of this earlier form of concerto include Giovanni Gabrieli's "In Ecclesiis" or Heinrich Schütz's "Saul, Saul, was verfolgst du mich".

Instrumental concerto

The concerto began to take its modern shape in the late-Baroque period, beginning with the concerto grosso form developed by Arcangelo Corelli. Corelli's concertino group was two violins, a cello and basso continuo. In J. S. Bach's Fifth Brandenburg Concerto, for example, the concertino is a flute, a violin, and a harpsichord; although the harpsichord is a featured solo instrument, it also sometimes plays with the ripieno, functioning as a continuo keyboard accompaniment.

Later, the concerto approached its modern form, in which the concertino usually reduces to a single solo instrument playing with (or against) an orchestra. The main composers of concertos of the baroque were Tommaso Albinoni, Antonio Vivaldi (e.g. published in L'estro armonico, La stravaganza, Six Violin Concertos, Op. 6, Twelve Concertos, Op. 7, Il cimento dell'armonia e dell'inventione, Six Flute Concertos, Op. 10, Six Concertos, Op. 11 and Six Violin Concertos, Op. 12), Georg Philipp Telemann, Johann Sebastian Bach, George Frideric Handel, Pietro Locatelli, Jean-Marie Leclair, Giuseppe Tartini, Francesco Geminiani and Johann Joachim Quantz.
The concerto was intended as a composition typical of the Italian style of the time, and all the composers were studying how to compose in the Italian fashion (all'Italiana).

The Baroque concerto was mainly for a string instrument (violin, viola, cello, seldom viola d'amore or harp) or a wind instrument (flute, recorder, oboe, bassoon, horn, or trumpet,). Bach also wrote a concerto for two violins and orchestra. During the Baroque period, before the invention of the piano, keyboard concertos were comparatively rare, with the exception of the organ and some harpsichord concertos by Johann Sebastian Bach.

Classical era

The concertos of the sons of Johann Sebastian Bach, such as C. P. E. Bach, are perhaps the best links between those of the Baroque period and those of the Classical era. It is conventional to state that the first movements of concertos from the Classical period onwards follow the structure of sonata form. Final movements are often in rondo form, as in J.S. Bach's E Major Violin Concerto.

Mozart wrote five violin concertos, all in 1775. They show a number of influences, notably Italian and Austrian. Several passages have leanings towards folk music, as manifested in Austrian serenades. Mozart also wrote the Sinfonia Concertante for violin, viola, and orchestra. Beethoven wrote only one violin concerto that remained obscure until revealed as a masterpiece in a performance by violin virtuoso Joseph Joachim on 27 May 1844.

C.P.E. Bach's keyboard concertos contain some virtuosic solo writing. Some of them have movements that run into one another without a break, and there are frequent cross-movement thematic references. Mozart, as a child, made arrangements for keyboard and orchestra of four sonatas by now little-known composers. Then he arranged three sonata movements by Johann Christian Bach. By the time he was twenty, Mozart was able to write concerto ritornelli that gave the orchestra admirable opportunity for asserting its character in an exposition with some five or six sharply contrasted themes, before the soloist enters to elaborate on the material. Of his 27 piano concertos, the last 22 are highly appreciated. A dozen cataloged keyboard concertos are attributed to Haydn, of which only three or four are considered genuine.

C. P. E. Bach wrote five flute concertos and two oboe concertos. Mozart wrote five horn concertos, with two for flute, oboe (later rearranged for flute and known as Flute Concerto No. 2), clarinet, and bassoon, four for horn, a Concerto for Flute, Harp, and Orchestra, and Exsultate, jubilate, a de facto concerto for soprano voice. They all exploit and explore the characteristics of the solo instrument(s). Haydn wrote an important trumpet concerto and a Sinfonia Concertante for violin, cello, oboe and bassoon as well as two horn concertos.

Romantic era

In the 19th century, the concerto as a vehicle for virtuosic display flourished, and concertos became increasingly complex and ambitious works. Whilst performances of typical concertos in the baroque era lasted about ten minutes, those by Beethoven could last half an hour or longer. The term concertino (composition), or the German Konzertstuck ("Concert Piece") began to be used to designate smaller pieces not considered large enough to be considered a full concerto, though the distinction has never been formalised and many Concertinos are still longer than the original Baroque concertos. 

During the Romantic era the cello became increasingly used as a concerto instrument; though the violin and piano remained the most frequently used. Beethoven contributed to the repertoire of concertos for more than one soloist with a  Triple Concerto for piano, violin, cello and orchestra while later in the century, Brahms wrote a  Double Concerto for violin, cello and orchestra.

20th and 21st century

Many of the concertos written in the early 20th century belong more to the late Romantic school, hence modernistic movement. Masterpieces were written by Edward Elgar (a violin concerto and a cello concerto), Sergei Rachmaninoff and Nikolai Medtner (four and three piano concertos, respectively), Jean Sibelius (a violin concerto), Frederick Delius (a violin concerto, a cello concerto, a piano concerto and a double concerto for violin and cello), Karol Szymanowski (two violin concertos and a "Symphonie Concertante" for piano), and Richard Strauss (two horn concertos, a violin concerto, Don Quixote—a tone poem that features the cello as a soloist—and among later works, an oboe concerto).

However, in the first decades of the 20th century, several composers such as Debussy, Schoenberg, Berg, Hindemith, Stravinsky, Prokofiev and Bartók started experimenting with ideas that were to have far-reaching consequences for the way music is written and, in some cases, performed. Some of these innovations include a more frequent use of modality, the exploration of non-western scales, the development of atonality and neotonality, the wider acceptance of dissonances, the invention of the twelve-tone technique of composition and the use of polyrhythms and complex time signatures.

These changes also affected the concerto as a musical form. Beside more or less radical effects on musical language, they led to a redefinition of the concept of virtuosity that included new and extended instrumental techniques and a focus on previously neglected aspects of sound such as pitch, timbre and dynamics. In some cases, they also brought about a new approach to the role of soloists and their relation to the orchestra.

Two great innovators of early 20th-century music, Schoenberg and Stravinsky, both wrote violin concertos. The material in Schoenberg's concerto, like that in Berg's, is linked by the twelve-tone serial method. In the 20th century, particularly after the Second World War, the cello enjoyed an unprecedented popularity. As a result, its concertante repertoire caught up with those of the piano and the violin both in terms of quantity and quality.

The 20th century also witnessed a growth of the concertante repertoire of instruments, some of which had seldom or never been used in this capacity, and even a concerto for wordless coloratura soprano by Reinhold Glière. As a result, almost all classical instruments now have a concertante repertoire. Among the works of the prolific composer Alan Hovhaness may be noted Prayer of St. Gregory for trumpet and strings, though it is not a concerto in the usual sense of the term. In the later 20th century the concerto tradition was continued by composers such as Maxwell Davies, whose series of Strathclyde Concertos exploit some of the instruments less familiar as soloists.

Concertos with concert band:
Bryant – 2007–2010
Foss – 2002
Husa – 1982
Jacob – 1974
Jager – 1982

By type

Vocal concerto

20th century:
Coloratura soprano Concerto: Reinhold Glière

Without orchestra

Single solo instrument

Baroque era:
 Bach:
 Italian Concerto
 Weimar concerto transcriptions

Multiple instruments

Baroque era:
 Bach's concerto for two harpsichords, BWV 1061.1
 Telemann's concertos for four violins

20th century:
 Webern's Concerto for Nine Instruments
 Stravinsky's Concerto for Two Pianos

For one instrumental soloist and orchestra

For bowed string instrument and orchestra

Violin concerto

Baroque era:
 Vivaldi:
 Nos. 3, 6, 9 and 12 of L'estro armonico
 La stravaganza
 Six Violin Concertos, Op. 6
 Ten of the Twelve Concertos, Op. 7
 Il cimento dell'armonia e dell'inventione, which includes The Four Seasons
 Five of the Six Concertos, Op. 11
 Six Violin Concertos, Op. 12
 Grosso mogul
 Bach:
 Violin Concerto in A minor
 Violin Concerto in E major

Classical era:
 Mozart:
 No. 1 in B flat major, K. 207
 No. 2 in D major, K. 211
 No. 3 in G major, K. 216 (Straßburg)
 No. 4 in D major, K. 218
 No. 5 in A major, K. 219 (Turkish)

Early Romantic traits can be found in the violin concertos of Viotti, but it is Spohr's twelve violin concertos, written between 1802 and 1827, that truly embrace the Romantic spirit with their melodic as well as their dramatic qualities.

20th century:
 Arnold Schoenberg
 Igor Stravinsky
 Alban Berg
 Bartók wrote two concertos for violin.
 Russian composers Prokofiev and Shostakovich each wrote two concertos while Khachaturian wrote a concerto and a Concerto-Rhapsody for the instrument.
 Hindemith's concertos hark back to the forms of the 19th century, even if the harmonic language he used was different.
 Three violin concertos from David Diamond show the form in neoclassical style.
 In 1950 Carlos Chávez completed a substantial Violin Concerto with an enormous central cadenza for the unaccompanied violin.
 Dutilleux's L'Arbre des songes has proved an important addition to the repertoire and a fine example of the composer's atonal yet melodic style.
 Other composers of major violin concertos include John Adams, Samuel Barber, Benjamin Britten, Peter Maxwell Davies, Miguel del Aguila, Philip Glass, Cristóbal Halffter, György Ligeti, Frank Martin, Bohuslav Martinů, Carl Nielsen, Walter Piston, Alfred Schnittke, Jean Sibelius, Ralph Vaughan Williams, William Walton, John Williams and Roger Sessions.

21st century:
Elfman's violin concerto

Viola concerto

Baroque era:
 Viola Concerto in G major (Telemann)

Classical era:
 Franz Anton Hoffmeister
 Viola Concerto in D major
 Viola Concerto in B-flat major

 Viola Concerto in D major, Op. 1 (Carl Stamitz)

 Viola Concerto in E♭ major, ICZ 17 (Carl Friedrich Zelter)

20th century:
 Viola concerto: Aho, Arnold, Bartók, del Aguila, Denisov, Gagneux, Gubaidulina, Hindemith, Kancheli, Martinů, Milhaud, Murail, Penderecki, Schnittke, Takemitsu, Walton

Cello concerto

The 'core' repertoire—performed the most of any cello concertos—are by Elgar, Dvořák, Saint-Saëns, Haydn, Shostakovich and Schumann, but many more concertos are performed nearly as often.

Baroque era:
 Vivaldi's cello concertos RV 398–403, 405–414 and 416–424

Classical era:
 Haydn wrote two cello concertos (for cello, oboes, horns, and strings), which are the most important works in that genre of the classical era. 
 Carl Philipp Emanuel Bach wrote three cello concertos and Luigi Boccherini wrote twelve cello concertos.

Romantic era:
 Antonín Dvořák's cello concerto ranks among the supreme examples from the Romantic era while Robert Schumann's focuses on the lyrical qualities of the instrument.
 The instrument was also popular with composers of the Franco-Belgian tradition: Saint-Saëns and Vieuxtemps wrote two cello concertos each and Lalo and Jongen one.
 Tchaikovsky's contribution to the genre is a series of Variations on a Rococo Theme. He also left very fragmentary sketches of a projected Cello Concerto. Cellist Yuriy Leonovich and Tchaikovsky researcher Brett Langston published their completion of the piece in 2006.
 Carl Reinecke, David Popper and Julius Klengel also wrote cello concertos that were popular in their time and are still played occasionally nowadays.
 Elgar's popular concerto, while written in the early 20th century, belongs to the late romantic period stylistically.

20th century:
 An important factor for the 20th-century cello concerto was the rise of virtuoso cellist Mstislav Rostropovich. His outstanding technique and passionate playing prompted dozens of composers to write pieces for him, first in his native Soviet Union and then abroad. Among such compositions may be listed Sergei Prokofiev's Symphony-Concerto, Dmitri Shostakovich's two cello concertos, Benjamin Britten's Cello-Symphony (which emphasizes, as its title suggests, the equal importance of soloist and orchestra), Henri Dutilleux' Tout un monde lointain..., Cristóbal Halffter's two cello concertos, Witold Lutosławski's cello concerto, Dmitry Kabalevsky's two cello concertos, Aram Khachaturian's Concerto-Rhapsody, Arvo Pärt's Pro et Contra, Alfred Schnittke, André Jolivet and Krzysztof Penderecki second cello concertos, Sofia Gubaidulina's Canticles of the Sun, Luciano Berio's Ritorno degli Snovidenia, Leonard Bernstein's Three Meditations, James MacMillan's cello concerto and Olivier Messiaen's Concert à quatre (a quadruple concerto for cello, piano, oboe, flute and orchestra).
 In addition, several important composers who were not directly influenced by Rostropovich wrote cello concertos: Samuel Barber, Elliott Carter, Carlos Chávez, Miguel del Aguila, Alexander Glazunov, Hans Werner Henze, Paul Hindemith, Arthur Honegger, Erich Wolfgang Korngold, György Ligeti, Bohuslav Martinů, Darius Milhaud, Nikolai Myaskovsky, Einojuhani Rautavaara, Joaquín Rodrigo, Toru Takemitsu, William Walton, Heitor Villa-Lobos, and Bernd Alois Zimmermann for instance.

Double bass concerto

20th century:
Double bass concerto: Aho, Gagneux, Dittersdorf, Henze, Koussevitsky, Davies, Ohzawa, Rautavaara, Skalkottas, Tubin

Other bowed string instruments

20th century:
Viola d'amore concerto: Hindemith

For plucked string instrument and orchestra

Harp concerto

Baroque era:
 Handel's Harp Concerto, HWV 294 (a.k.a. )

Classical era:
 Wolfgang Amadeus Mozart: Concerto for Flute, Harp, and Orchestra
 Jean-Baptiste Krumpholz: Harp Concertos  and 
 Francesco Petrini: Harp Concertos ,  and 
 Ernst Eichner's 
 Jan Ladislav Dussek: Harp Concertos ,  and 
 François-Adrien Boieldieu's 

Romantic era:
 Nicolas-Charles Bochsa: Harp Concertos  and 
 Elias Parish Alvars: Harp Concertos  and 
 Carl Reinecke's 
 John Thomas's 
 Henriette Renié's 

20th century:
 Reinhold Glière's Harp Concerto
 Joseph Jongen's Harp Concerto
 Joaquín Rodrigo's Concierto serenata
 André Jolivet's Concerto for Harp and Chamber Orchestra (1952)
 Darius Milhaud's Harp Concerto, Op. 323 (1953)
 Heitor Villa-Lobos's Harp Concerto
 Alberto Ginastera's Harp Concerto
 Einojuhani Rautavaara's Harp Concerto (2000)

Mandolin concerto

Baroque era:
 Vivaldi's Mandolin Concerto, RV 425

20th century:
 Thile, Dorman

Guitar concerto

20th century:
Guitar Concerto: Arnold, E. Bernstein, Brouwer, Castelnuovo-Tedesco, Hovhaness, Malmsteen, Ohana, Ponce, Rodrigo, Trigos, Villa-Lobos

Other plucked string instruments

Baroque era:
 Lute concerto in D major (Vivaldi)

20th century:
Kanun Concerto: Alnar

For woodwind instrument and orchestra

Flute concerto

Baroque era:
 Vivaldi:
 Six Flute Concertos, Op. 10
 Il gran mogol

Classical era:
 Mozart:
 Flute Concerto No. 1
 Flute Concerto No. 2

20th century:
Western concert flute Concerto: Aho, Arnold, Chaminade, Corigliano, Davies, Denisov, Dusapin, Harman, Hétu, Ibert, Jolivet, Landowski, Nielsen, Penderecki, Piston, Rautavaara, Rodrigo, Takemitsu, J. Williams
Contrabass flute Concerto: McGowan
Piccolo Concerto: Davies, Liebermann
Recorder concerto: Malcolm Arnold, Richard Harvey
Shakuhachi Concerto: Takemitsu

Oboe concerto

Baroque era:
 Vivaldi:
 Two of the Twelve Concertos, Op. 7
 One of the Six Concertos, Op. 11
 Handel:
 Oboe Concerto No. 1
 Oboe Concerto No. 2
 Oboe Concerto No. 3

Classical era:
 Mozart: Oboe Concerto

Romantic era:
 Vincenzo Bellini: Oboe Concerto

20th century:
Oboe concerto: Aho, Arnold, Bouliane, Corigliano, Davies, Denisov, Harman, MacMillan, Maderna, Martinů, Penderecki, Shchedrin, Strauss, Vaughan Williams, Zimmermann
Bass oboe concerto: Bryars

English horn

20th century:
English Horn Concerto: Bernard Hoffer, William Kraft, Nicholas Maw, Vazgen Muradian, Vincent Persichetti, Ned Rorem, Pēteris Vasks, Henk de Vlieger

Bassoon concerto

20th century:
Bassoon concerto: Aho, Butterworth, Davies, del Aguila, Donatoni, Eckhardt-Gramatté, Fujikura, Gubaidulina, Hétu, Jolivet, Kaipainen, Knipper, Landowski, Panufnik, Rihm, Rota, Sæverud, J. Williams
Contrabassoon Concerto: Aho, Erb

Clarinet concerto

20th century:
Clarinet concerto: Aho, Arnold, Chin, Copland, Davies, del Aguila, Denisov, Dusapin, Fairouz, Finzi, Françaix, Hartke, Hétu, Hindemith, Nielsen, Penderecki, Piston, Rautavaara, Shapey, Stravinsky, Takemitsu, Ticheli, Tomasi, J. Williams
Bass clarinet Concerto: Bouliane

21st century:
Lindberg's clarinet concerto

Saxophone concerto

20th century:
Soprano saxophone Concerto: Aho, Higdon, Hovhaness, Mackey, Torke, Yoshimatsu.
Alto saxophone Concerto: Adams, Creston, Dahl, Denisov, Dubois, Glazunov, Husa, Ibert, Koch, Larsson, Maslanka, Muczynski, Salonen, Ticheli, Tomasi, J. Williams, Worley, Yoshimatsu
Tenor saxophone Concerto: Bennett, Ewazen, Gould, Nicolau, Ward, Wilder.
Baritone saxophone Concerto: Gaines, Glaser, Haas, van Beurden

Other woodwind instruments

20th century:
Bagpipe: Chieftain's Salute by Graham Waterhouse

For brass instrument and orchestra

Trumpet concerto

20th century:
Trumpet Concerto:

Horn concerto

Classical era:
 Bohemian composer Francesco Antonio Rosetti composed several solo and double horn concertos. He was a significant contributor to the genre of horn concertos in the 18th century. Most of his outstanding horn concertos were composed between 1782 and 1789 for the Bohemian duo Franz Zwierzina and Joseph Nage while at the Bavarian court of Oettingen-Wallerstein. One of his best-known works in this genre is his Horn Concerto in E flat major C49/K III:36. It consists of three movements: 1. Allegro moderato 2. Romance 3. Rondo. Many common features of the galant style are present in Rosetti's music and composing style. In his E-flat horn concerto, we hear periodic and short phrases, galant harmonic rhythm and melodic line reduction. Rosetti's influence on the 18th century composers, musicians and music was considerable. At the Bavarian court of Oettingen-Wallerstein, his music was often performed by the Wallerstein ensembles. In Paris, his compositions were performed by the best ensembles of the city, including the orchestra of the Concert Spirituel. His publishers were Le Menu et Boyer and Sieber. According to H. C. Robbins Landon (Mozart scholar), Rosetti's horn concertos might have been a model for Mozart's horn concertos.

20th century:
French horn Concerto: Aho, Arnold, Arutiunian, Atterberg, Bowen, Carter, Davies, Glière, Gipps, Hindemith, Hovhaness, Jacob, Knussen, Ligeti, Murail, Penderecki, Strauss, Tomasi, J. Williams

Trombone concerto

20th century:
Trombone Concerto: Aho, Bourgeois, David, Dusapin, Gagneux, Grøndahl, Holmboe, Larsson, Milhaud, Nyman, Olsen, Rota, Rouse, Sandström, Tomasi

Other brass instruments

20th century:
Cornet Concerto: Wright
Euphonium Concerto: Bach, Ball, Bourgeois, Brusick, Clarke, Cosma, Curnow, Day, Jager, De Meij, Downie Ellerby, Ewazen, Feinstein, Filas, Gaines, Gillingham, Golland, Graham, Gregson, Groslot, Hoddinott, Horovitz, Jansa, Jenkins, Lindberg, Linkola, Lisjak, Mealor, Meechan, O'Toole, Roberts, Scott, Sparke, Stevens, Wesolowski, Wilby.
Tuba Concerto: Aho, Arutiunian, Broughton, Gagneux, Holmboe, Vaughan Williams, J. Williams

Keyboard concerto

Harpsichord concerto

Baroque era:
 Harpsichord concertos, BWV 1052–1059 (Bach)

20th century:
Harpsichord Concerto: Falla, Glass, Górecki, Nyman, Martinů, Poulenc

Organ concerto

Baroque era:
 Handel:
 Organ concertos, Op.4
 Organ concertos, Op.7

20th century:
Organ concerto: Arnold, Hanson, Harrison, Hétu, Hindemith, Jongen, MacMillan, Peeters, Poulenc, Rorem, Sowerby

Piano concerto

Classical era:
 Mozart:
 Three Concertos after J.C. Bach, K. 107
 No. 1 in F major, K. 37
 No. 2 in B major, K. 39
 No. 3 in D major, K. 40
 No. 4 in G major, K. 41
 No. 5 in D major, K. 175
 No. 6 in B major, K. 238
 No. 8 in C major, K. 246 (Lützow)
 No. 9 in E major, K. 271 (Jeunehomme / Jenamy)
 No. 11 in F major, K. 413
 No. 12 in A major, K. 414
 No. 13 in C major, K. 415
 No. 14 in E major, K. 449
 No. 15 in B major, K. 450
 No. 16 in D major, K. 451
 No. 17 in G major, K. 453
 No. 18 in B major, K. 456
 No. 19 in F major, K. 459
 No. 20 in D minor, K. 466
 No. 21 in C major, K. 467
 No. 22 in E major, K. 482
 No. 23 in A major, K. 488
 No. 24 in C minor, K. 491
 No. 25 in C major, K. 503
 No. 26 in D major, K. 537 (Coronation)
 No. 27 in B major, K. 595

Romantic era:
 Beethoven's five piano concertos increase the technical demands made on the soloist. The last two are particularly remarkable, integrating the concerto into a large symphonic structure with movements that frequently run into one another. His Piano Concerto No. 4 starts with a statement by the piano, after which the orchestra enters in a foreign key, to present what would normally be the opening tutti. The work has a lyrical character. The slow movement is a dramatic dialogue between the soloist and the orchestra. His Piano Concerto No. 5 has the basic rhythm of a Viennese military march. There is no lyrical second subject, but in its place a continuous development of the opening material.
 The piano concertos of Cramer, Field, Düssek, Woelfl, Ries, and Hummel provide a link from the Classical concerto to the Romantic concerto.
 Chopin wrote two piano concertos in which the orchestra is relegated to an accompanying role. Schumann, despite being a pianist-composer, wrote a piano concerto in which virtuosity is never allowed to eclipse the essential lyrical quality of the work. The gentle, expressive melody heard at the beginning on woodwind and horns (after the piano's heralding introductory chords) bears the material for most of the argument in the first movement. In fact, argument in the traditional developmental sense is replaced by a kind of variation technique in which soloist and orchestra interweave their ideas.
 Liszt's mastery of piano technique matched that of Paganini for the violin. His concertos No. 1 and No. 2 left a deep impression on the style of piano concerto writing, influencing Rubinstein, and especially Tchaikovsky, whose First Piano Concerto's rich chordal opening is justly famous.
 Grieg's concerto likewise begins in a striking manner after which it continues in a lyrical vein.
 Saint-Saëns wrote five piano concertos and orchestra between 1858 and 1896, in a classical vein.
 Brahms's First Piano Concerto in D minor (pub 1861) was the result of an immense amount of work on a mass of material originally intended for a symphony. His Second Piano Concerto in B major (1881) has four movements and is written on a larger scale than any earlier concerto. Like his violin concerto, it is symphonic in proportions.
 Fewer piano concertos were written in the late Romantic Period. But Sergei Rachmaninoff wrote four piano concertos between 1891 and 1926. His Second and Third, being the most popular of the four, went on to become among the most famous in the piano repertoire.
 Other romantic piano concertos, like those by Kalkbrenner, Henri Herz, Moscheles and Thalberg were also very popular in the Romantic era, but not today.

20th century:
 Maurice Ravel wrote two pianos concertos, one in G-major (1931) and the second for the left hand in D-major (date of creation1932).
 Igor Stravinsky wrote three works for solo piano and orchestra:
 Concerto for Piano and Wind Instruments
 Capriccio for Piano and Orchestra
 Movements for Piano and Orchestra
 Sergei Prokofiev, another Russian composer, wrote five piano concertos, which he himself performed.
 Dmitri Shostakovich composed two piano concertos. 
 Aram Khachaturian contributed to the repertoire with a piano concerto and a Concerto-Rhapsody.
 Arnold Schoenberg's Piano Concerto is a well-known example of a dodecaphonic piano concerto.
 Béla Bartók also wrote three piano concertos. Like their violin counterparts, they show the various stages in his musical development. Bartok's also rearranged his chamber piece, Sonata for Two Pianos and Percussion, into a Concerto for Two Pianos and Percussion, adding orchestral accompaniment.
 Cristóbal Halffter wrote a prize-winning neoclassical Piano Concerto in 1953, and a second Piano Concerto in 1987–88.
 Ralph Vaughan Williams wrote a concerto for piano, though it was later reworked as a concerto for two pianos and orchestra—both versions have been recorded
 Benjamin Britten's concerto for piano (1938) is a prominent work from his early period.
 Piano concertos by Latin-American composers include one by Carlos Chávez, two by Alberto Ginastera, and five by Heitor Villa-Lobos.
 György Ligeti's concerto (1988) has a synthetic quality: it mixes complex rhythms, the composer's Hungarian roots and his experiments with micropolyphony from the 1960s and 1970s.
 Witold Lutosławski's piano concerto, completed in the same year, alternates between playfulness and mystery. It also displays a partial return to melody after the composer's aleatoric period.
 Russian composer Rodion Shchedrin has written six piano concertos.
 Finnish composer Einojuhani Rautavaara wrote three piano concertos, the third one dedicated to Vladimir Ashkenazy, who played and conducted the world première.
 French composer Germaine Tailleferre and Czech composers Bohuslav Martinů and Vítězslava Kaprálová wrote piano concertos.

Accordion concerto

20th century:
Accordion concerto: Hovhaness, Sofia Gubaidulina, Toshio Hosokawa, Kalevi Aho
Free bass accordion Concerto: John Serry Sr.<ref>[https://books.google.com/books?id=N0chAQAAIAAJ&dq=Catalog+of+Copyright+Entries+John+Serry+1968&pg=PA1626 Library of Congress Copyright Office -  Catalog of Copyright Entries: Third Series Music July-December 1968, Vol. 22, Part 5, Number 2, Section 1,  published 1970, p. 1626 "Concerto in C Major for Bassetti Accordion" Op. 1 John Serry 1968, Solo Arrangement Jan. 1, 1968 No. EP247602 on http://books.google.com]</ref>

Other keyboard instruments

20th century:
Bandoneón Concerto: Piazzolla
Clavinet concerto: Woolf
Yamaha GX-1: Akutagawa

Other instrumental soloist

Percussion instrument

20th century:
Percussion concerto: Aho, Dorman, Glass, Jolivet, MacMillan, Milhaud, Rautavaara, Susman
Timpani concerto: Aho, Druschetzky, Glass, Kraft, Rosauro
Xylophone concerto: Mayuzumi
Marimba concerto: Creston, Larsen, Milhaud, Rosauro (Concerto No.1 and No.2), Svoboda, Viñao
Vibraphone: Rosauro (Concerto No.1 and Concerto No.2)

Free reed aerophone

20th century:
Harmonica concerto: Arnold, Hovhaness, Vaughan Williams, Villa-Lobos
Sheng Concerto: Unsuk Chin.

Electronic musical instrument

20th century:
Ondes Martenot concerto: Jolivet, Rozsa
Theremin concerto: Aho

For multiple instruments and orchestra

In the Baroque era, two violins and one cello formed the standard concertino of a concerto grosso. In the classical era, the sinfonia concertante replaced the concerto grosso genre, although concertos for two or three soloists were still composed too. From the Romantic era works for multiple instrumental soloists and orchestra were again commonly called concerto.

Two soloists

Baroque era:
 Vivaldi's concertos for 2 violins, for 2 cellos, for 2 mandolins, for 2 trumpets, for 2 flutes, for oboe and bassoon, for cello and bassoon (etc.)
 Bach:
 Concerto for Two Violins
 Concertos for two harpsichords: BWV 1060, 1061 and 1062
 Telemann's Concerto for Two Violas

Classical era:
 Haydn's concerto for violin and keyboard (usually referred to as the Keyboard Concerto No. 6)
 Mozart:
 Piano Concerto No. 10
 Concerto for Flute, Harp, and Orchestra
 Salieri's double concerto for flute and oboe

Romantic era:
 Felix Mendelssohn:
 Concerto for Two Pianos and Orchestra in E major
 Concerto for Two Pianos and Orchestra in A-flat major
 Johannes Brahms's Double Concerto for violin and cello
 Max Bruch:
 Concerto for Clarinet, Viola, and Orchestra
 Concerto for Two Pianos and Orchestra

20th century:
 Dmitri Shostakovich's Piano Concerto No. 1 (soloists: piano, trumpet)
 Malcolm Arnold's Concerto for Two Violins and String Orchestra
 Francis Poulenc's Concerto for Two Pianos and Orchestra
 Ralph Vaughan Williams's Concerto for Two Pianos and Orchestra
 Elliott Carter's Double Concerto for Harpsichord and Piano with Two Chamber Orchestras
 Peter Maxwell Davies's Strathclyde Concerto No. 3 for horn, trumpet and orchestra, and No. 4 for violin, viola and string orchestra

Three soloists

Baroque era:
 Arcangelo Corelli's twelve concerti grossi, Op. 6 for two violins and cello
 Vivaldi's concertos for 3 violins
 Bach:
 Brandenburg Concertos Nos. 4 (BWV 1049) and 5 (BWV 1050)
 Concertos for three harpsichords: BWV 1063 and 1064
 Triple Concerto, BWV 1044, for harpsichord, flute and violin

Classical era:
 Mozart's Piano Concerto No. 7

Romantic era:
 Beethoven's Triple Concerto for piano, violin, and cello.

21st century:
 Smirnov's Triple Concerto No. 2

Four or more soloists

Baroque era:
 Vivaldi:
 L'estro armonico Nos. 1, 4, 7 and 10
 RV 555, featuring 3 violins, an oboe, 2 recorders, 2 viole all'inglese, a chalumeau, 2 cellos, 2 harpsichords and 2 trumpets.
 Concerto for Diverse Instruments in C major, RV 558
 Concerto in C major, RV 559, for two oboes, two clarinets, strings and continuo
 Bach:
 Brandenburg Concertos Nos. 1 (BWV 1046) and 2 (BWV 1047)
 Concerto for 4 harpsichords, BWV 1065 (after a concerto for four violins by Vivaldi)

20th century:
 Arnold Schoenberg's Concerto for String Quartet and Orchestra
 Maxwell Davies's Strathclyde Concerto and No. 9 for piccolo, alto flute, cor anglais, E-flat clarinet, bass clarinet, contrabassoon and string orchestra.
 Frank Martin's Concerto for seven wind instruments, timpani, percussion, and string orchestra.
 Jon Lord's Concerto for Group and Orchestra for rock band.
 Joaquín Rodrigo's Concierto Andaluz for 4 guitars.
 Alfred Schnittke's Concerto Grosso No. 3
 Olivier Messiaen's Concert à quatre for piano, cello, oboe and flute.

Concerto for orchestra

Symphonic orchestra
In the 20th and 21st centuries, several composers wrote concertos for orchestra. In these works, different sections and/or instruments of the orchestra or concert band are treated at one point or another as soloists with emphasis on solo sections and/or instruments changing during the piece. Some examples include those written by:
Hindemith – Op. 38, 1925
Kodály – 1940
Bartók – Concerto for Orchestra – 1945
Lutoslawski – Concerto for Orchestra – 1954
Shchedrin
 No. 1 Naughty Limericks (1963)
 No. 2 The Chimes (1968)
 No. 3 Old Russian Circus Music (1989)
 No. 4 Round Dances (Khorovody) (1989)
 No. 5 Four Russian Songs (1998)
Carter – 1969
Knussen – 1969
Lindberg – 2003

Dutilleux has also described his Métaboles as a concerto for orchestra.

Chamber orchestra or string orchestra

Baroque era:
 Vivaldi's Concerto alla rustica
 Bach's Brandenburg Concertos Nos. 3 (BWV 1048) and 6 (BWV 1051)

20th century:
 Stravinsky:
 Concerto in D
 Dumbarton Oaks concerto

More than one orchestra

Baroque era:
 , HWV 332–334

20th century:
 Michael Tippett: Concerto for Double String Orchestra

References

Sources
 
 
 
 
 
 
 
 
 
 
 
 
 
 
 
 
 
 
 
 
 
 
 
 
 
 
 
 
 

Further reading
 Hill, Ralph, Ed., 1952, The Concerto, Penguin Books.
 
 Randel, Don Michael, Ed., 1986, The New Harvard Dictionary of Music, Harvard University Press, Cambridge, MA and London.
 Tovey, Donald Francis, 1936, Essays in Musical Analysis, Volume III, Concertos'', Oxford University Press.

External links

 

 
Classical music styles